The Gibraltar national rugby union team represent Gibraltar in men's rugby union. 

The nation is not currently affiliated to World Rugby and have yet to qualify for a World Cup.

On 5 November 2011 the Gibraltar Rugby Football Union (GRFU) fielded a national team in its first official Test Match. The fixture was against the Belgium Development Team and was held in Brussels. The final score was: Belgium Development 20 – Gibraltar 8. 

Test Caps have officially been awarded to the Gibraltar team players, this came after playing and defeating a Cyprus XV and an Israel A team. Their first full international came against Malta in March 2015.

The GRFU went through the process of FIRA/AER (European Rugby Federation) membership. The GRFU had planned other international fixtures for April 2012. This however was blocked by Spain. This came as a surprise as UEFA and the ICC recognize Gibraltar.

The Gibraltar national rugby sevens team plays regularly in tournaments, particularly in the Tangier Sevens.

International record

See also
 Rugby union in Gibraltar

References

Rugby union in Gibraltar
European national rugby union teams
National sports teams of Gibraltar